The Women’s European Boxing Championships was hosted and organised by the Bulgarian Boxing Association in Sofia, Bulgaria in 2016. The event was held from 14 to 24 November 2016. The tournament was organised in association with the European Boxing Confederation (EUBC).

Medal table
Source:

Medal winners
Source:

Participating nations 
129 boxers from 28 nations competed.

 (1)
 (9)
 (6)
 (6)
 (5)
 (2)
  (2)
 (7)
 (4)
 (3)
 (1)
 (9)
 (7)
 (7)
 (2)
 (1)
 (1)
 (1)
  (2)
 (5)
 (4)
 (10)
 (4)
   (1)
 (6)
 (9)
 (10)
 (4)

References

Women's European Amateur Boxing Championships
2016 in women's boxing
Boxing
Sports competitions in Sofia
European
November 2016 sports events in Europe
2010s in Sofia